is a general term describing the traditional Japanese martial arts of throwing shuriken, which are small, hand-held weapons used primarily by the Samurai in feudal Japan, such as metal spikes bō shuriken, circular plates of metal known as hira shuriken, and knives (tantō).

Shurikenjutsu was usually taught among the sogo-bugei, or comprehensive martial arts systems of Japan, as a supplemental art to those more commonly practiced such as kenjutsu, sojutsu, bōjutsu and battlefield grappling kumi-uchi (old form jujutsu), and is much less prevalent today than it was in the feudal era.

History
There is a lack of reliable documentation regarding the art's history when compared to other arts, however there are various oral traditions peculiar to each school (Ryu), that describe how their art developed and came to be used within their system.

The art possesses many originators and innovators who discovered and developed their own various methods of adapting everyday objects into throwing weapons, hence the wide variety  of both schools and blades. Furthermore, the art itself is typically quite secretive, as shurikenjutsu gains its tactical advantage by using stealth and surprise. Shuriken are small and easily concealed, yet they have the versatility of being used as a stabbing weapon at close range (called shoken if used in this manner), as well as a longer range thrown weapon.

Types of shuriken

Shuriken consist of two basic designs:
Bo-shuriken - straight metal spikes, usually 4-sided but sometimes round or octagonal. They were normally single-pointed but variations exist that are double pointed. The average length was 16 cm and the average weight was around 50 grams. The bo shuriken is thrown by holding it in the palm with the shaft resting between the first and second fingers. They are thrown from either hand, overhand, underhand, or sidearm from standing, seated, and lying positions. This is the most common form of shuriken used in traditional shurikenjutsu.
Hira-shuriken, shaken (or "throwing stars") - flat, wheel-shaped plates of metal, with sharpened points. Usually 3 mm thick or less, about 11 cm wide, with a variety of tips ranging between 3-20. The hira-shuriken can be thrown either from overhead, or horizontally with a quick wrist-snap, depending on the weapon.

Modern practice
The decree to outlaw shurikenjutsu during Japan's Tokugawa period drove the practice underground, and further shrouded it in secrecy. As the Edo-era drew to a close, the abolition of the Samurai caste system and the subsequent modernization of Japan's military, led to the near extinction of shurikenjutsu. In fact, of the 50 or so styles which once existed, only a few remain fully intact today; passed down over the generations via an unbroken lineage. The only specialist school to have survived is the Negishi-ryū, which was founded by Negishi Shorei in the mid-1800s. Modern-day shurikenjutsu authorities, Naruse Kanji 成瀬関次(1888 - 1948) and Fujita Seiko 藤田西湖(1899 - 1966) also transmitted valuable information to future generations in the form of articles, books, photos and illustrations. Today, the largest organization focusing on the use of shuriken is the Meifu Shinkage-ryū, a modern-day school, founded by Someya Chikatoshi in the late 1970s.

Popular culture
 Shurikenjutsu is featured in many martial arts franchises including Teenage Mutant Ninja Turtles, Power Rangers Ninja Storm, Power Rangers Samurai, Digimon, Power Rangers Ninja Steel, etc.
 Shurikenjutsu is used by Hawkeye in the Marvel Cinematic Universe. 
 Shurikenjutsu is used by Espio the Chameleon in Sonic the Hedgehog.
 The DC Comics hero Batman uses shurikenjutsu when throwing batarangs. This was also done by Batgirl as well as many Robins such as Dick Grayson, Jason Todd, Tim Drake, and Damian Wayne.

See also
Saitō Satoshi
Meifu Shinkage-ryū

References

Further reading
 Nawa, Yumio (1962) Kakushi Buki Soran (An Overview of Hidden Weapons) Japan
 Seiko Fujita (June 1964) Zukai Shurikenjutsu / 図解 手裏剣術 (An Overview of Shuriken-jutsu)
 Finn, Michael (1983) Art of Shuriken Jutsu  Paul Crompton, UK
 Shirakami, Eizo (1985) Shuriken-do: My study of the way of Shuriken,  Paul H. Crompton, London
 Hammond, Billy (1985) Shuriken jutsu: The Japanese art of projectile throwing A.E.L.S, Japan ASIN B0007B60TC
 Kono, Yoshinori (1996). Toru Shirai: Founder of Tenshin Shirai Ryu in "Aikido Journal" #108
 Iwai, Kohaku (1999) Hibuki no Subete ga Wakaru Hon (Hidden Weapons) BAB, Japan
 Saito, Satoshi in Skoss, Diane ed. (1999) Sword & Spirit: Classical Warrior Traditions of Japan Vol. 2 Koryu Books,
 Someya, Chikatoshi (2001) Shuriken Giho Airyudo, Japan
 Otsuka, Yasuyuki (2004) Shuriken no Susume  BAB, Japan
 Feldmann, Thomas (2010) Interview with Soke Yasuyuki Ôtsuka in "Toshiya" No. 1, 2010, pp. 32–35
 Spirit: Classical Warrior Traditions of Japan Vol. 2 Koryu Books,
 Someya, Chikatoshi (2001) Shuriken Giho Airyudo, Japan
 Otsuka, Yasuyuki (2004) Shuriken no Susume  BAB, Japan
 Feldmann, Thomas (2010) Interview with Soke Yasuyuki Ôtsuka'' in "Toshiya" No. 1, 2010, pp.

Japanese martial arts
Ko-ryū bujutsu
Ninjutsu skills